Ozarba cryptochrysea is a moth of the family Noctuidae first described by George Hampson in 1902. It is found Madagascar, Mozambique and South Africa.

It has an expansion of 22 mm.

References

Acontiinae
Lepidoptera of Mozambique
Lepidoptera of South Africa
Moths of Madagascar
Moths of Sub-Saharan Africa
Moths described in 1902